Yerington Municipal Airport  is a mile north of Yerington, in Lyon County, Nevada. The National Plan of Integrated Airport Systems for 2011–2015 categorized it as a general aviation facility.

Facilities
The airport covers 101 acres (41 ha) at an elevation of 4,382 feet (1,336 m). Its single runway, 1/19, is 5,814 by 75 feet (1,772 x 23 m).

In the year ending June 30, 2009 the airport had 25,900 aircraft operations, average 70 per day: 99% general aviation, 1% military, and <1% air taxi. 44 aircraft were then based here: 86% single-engine and 14% multi-engine.

See also 
 List of airports in Nevada

References

External links 
   from Nevada DOT
 Aerial image as of  June 1994 from USGS The National Map
 

Airports in Nevada
Transportation in Lyon County, Nevada
Buildings and structures in Lyon County, Nevada